The Other Side is the debut album of Canadian country music artist Charlie Major. All six singles released from the album went to #1 on the RPM Country chart. "Life's Too Short" was co-written by Kathie Baillie and Michael Bonagura, two-thirds of the 1980s country group Baillie & the Boys.

Track listing

 "I'm Gonna Drive You Out of My Mind" (Charlie Major, Barry Brown) – 4:07
 "I'm Somebody" (Major, Brown) – 3:34
 "It Can't Happen to Me" (Major) – 3:58
 "I'm Here" (Major, Brown) – 3:32
 "Running in the Red" (Major, Randall Prescott) – 3:46
 "Life's Too Short" (Don Schlitz, Michael Bonagura, Kathie Baillie) – 3:36
 "Nobody Gets Too Much Love" (Major) – 3:24
 "Walk Away" (Major) – 4:20
 "The Other Side" (Major) – 3:07
 "I'll See You in My Dreams" (Major) – 3:23

Chart performance

External links
 [ allmusic.com]

Charlie Major albums
1993 debut albums
Arista Records albums
Canadian Country Music Association Album of the Year albums